In forestry, a widowmaker or fool killer is a detached or broken limb or tree top. The name indicates that such objects can kill forest workers by falling on them. The U.S. Occupational Safety and Health Administration describes widowmakers as "broken off limbs that are hanging freely in the tree to be felled or in the trees close by."

Causes
Widowmakers are often caused by fungal growth over a sustained period. Other causes include damage from other falling trees or stress on a branch.

Hazards
Widowmakers may pose a risk to equipment or personnel working under or around the tree. They can become dislodged by wind or during tree felling, and are responsible for 11% of all fatal chainsaw accidents. The U.S. National Institute for Occupational Safety and Health (NIOSH) offers ways to eliminate risks by avoiding working beneath widowmakers, knocking them down, or pulling them down with a machine.

See also
 Snag

References

Logging